The 1933 Washington Huskies football team was an American football team that represented the University of Washington during the 1933 college football season. In its fourth season under head coach Jimmy Phelan, the team compiled a 5–4 record, finished in seventh place in the Pacific Coast Conference, and outscored all opponents by a combined total of 88 to 81. Bill Smith was the team captain.

Schedule

References

Washington
Washington Huskies football seasons
Washington Huskies football